Sehnaoui (Arabic: صحناوي) is a Lebanese surname that may refer to
Antoun Sehnaoui, Lebanese banker and film producer
Khalil Sehnaoui, Belgian-Lebanese information security consultant 
Mouna Bassili Sehnaoui (born 1945), Lebanese painter, writer and artist, mother of Khalil
Nada Sehnaoui (born 1958), Lebanese visual artist and political activist
Nicolas Sehnaoui (born 1967), Lebanese politician, cousin of Antoun and Khalil, nephew of Mouna

Arabic-language surnames